Stronger Than the Law (Swedish: Starkare än lagen) is a 1951 Swedish historical drama film directed by Bengt Logardt and Arnold Sjöstrand and starring Margareta Fahlén,  Bengt Logardt and Margit Carlqvist. It was shot at the Centrumateljéerna Studios in Stockholm. The film's sets were designed by the art director P.A. Lundgren.

Synopsis
The film is set in the 1870s in a remote community in the mountains of Northern Sweden. A strange man from the south arrives, and interacts with the strait-laced Anna and the bubbly Mimmi who openly flouts convention. Eventually it turns out that he has killed a man and is on the run.

Cast
 Margareta Fahlén as 	Anna Persson
 Bengt Logardt as 	Helge Andersson
 Margit Carlqvist as 	Mimmi
 Arnold Sjöstrand as Anders Olsson
 Eva Stiberg 	Stina
 Sven Magnusson as 	Per
 Peter Lindgren as 	Manuel
 Yvonne Lombard as 	Elvira
 Åke Fridell as Mattias
 Sten Lindgren as 	Parish constable
 Eric Laurent as Johan Persson
 Albert Ståhl as Ola
Georg Skarstedt as 	Priest
 Edel Stenberg as 	Mme Petersen
 Alf Östlund as Stenerud

References

Bibliography 
 Wright, Rochelle. The Visible Wall: Jews and Other Ethnic Outsiders in Swedish Film. SIU Press, 1998.

External links 
 

1951 films
1951 drama films
1950s Swedish-language films
Swedish black-and-white films
Films set in the 1870s
Swedish historical drama films
1950s historical drama films
1950s Swedish films